Achillea tomentosa, commonly known as woolly yarrow, is a flowering plant in the family Asteraceae. It is sometimes kept as a garden plant, and occasionally naturalizes outside its original range of dry lowland habitats of southern Europe and (possibly) western Asia. It is a recipient of the RHS's Award of Garden Merit.

Description
Achillea tomentosa is quite similar in appearance to common yarrow Achillea millefolium, but typically has yellow ligules, more numerous disc florets, and strawcolored involucral bracts with translucent margins. Also, A. tomentosa is diploid, unlike the polyploid common yarrows.

Notes

References

tomentosa
Garden plants of Europe
Groundcovers
Flora of Southwestern Europe
Flora of Southeastern Europe
Plants described in 1753
Taxa named by Carl Linnaeus